The Essential Kenny Loggins is the third compilation and second greatest hits album by American singer-songwriter Kenny Loggins, released on November 19, 2002. It is part of Sony BMG's Essential series of compilation albums and includes tracks from Loggins' solo output, as well as tracks from his Loggins and Messina days. A limited edition was released with seven additional tracks.

Track listing

Disc one

Disc two

Disc three (Limited edition 3.0)

 "Till the Ends Meet" - 3:09
 "The More We Try" - 4:00
 "Easy Driver" - 3:34
 "Love Will Follow" - 7:13
 "Sweet Reunion" - 5:47
 "Always, In All Ways" - 4:09
 "Junkanoo Holiday (Fallin'-Flyin')" - 5:03

Personnel
 Kenny Loggins – vocals, rhythm guitar, harmonica, acoustic guitar
 Jim Messina – vocals, lead guitar, electric mandolin, acoustic guitar (tracks 1-7)
 Stevie Nicks – lead and backing vocals on "Whenever I Call You Friend"
 Mike Hamilton – guitar, backing vocals
 George Hawkins – bass, backing vocals
 Brian Mann – keyboards
 Tris Imboden – drums, harmonica
 Jon Clarke – horns, woodwinds
 Vince Denham – horns
 Bob James – string arrangements
 Dann Huff – guitar on "Danger Zone"
 Giorgio Moroder – keyboards on "Danger Zone"
 Tom Whitlock – synthesizer on "Danger Zone"
 John Robinson – drum fills on "Danger Zone"
 Tom Scott – saxophone on "Danger Zone"
 Steve Perry – co-lead vocals on "Don't Fight It"
 Neil Giraldo – lead guitar on "Don't Fight It"
 Mike Hamilton – bass on "Don't Fight It"
 Dennis Conway – drums on "Don't Fight It"
 Tris Imboden – percussion on "Don't Fight It"

Loggins & Messina band
 Merel Bregante – backing vocals, drums (tracks 1–7)
 Lester "Al" Garth – violin, recorder, alto and tenor saxophones (tracks 1–7)
 Jon Clarke – flute, oboe, recorder, baritone saxophone, soprano saxophone, tenor saxophone (tracks 1–7)
 Larry Sims – backing vocals, bass (tracks 1-7)

Charts

Release history

References

2002 compilation albums
Kenny Loggins albums
Columbia Records compilation albums
Albums produced by Kenny Loggins
Albums produced by Jim Messina (musician)
Albums produced by Bob James (musician)
Albums produced by Phil Ramone
Albums produced by Tom Dowd
Albums produced by Bruce Botnick
Albums produced by David Foster
Albums produced by Michael Omartian
Albums produced by Giorgio Moroder
Albums produced by Peter Asher
2002 greatest hits albums